Oedipina maritima, commonly known as the maritime worm salamander, is a species of salamander in the family Plethodontidae. It is endemic to Isla Escudo de Veraguas, Panama.

Description
The head is small and narrow, and the body is slender, with tail longer than SVL.

The clutch size is about six eggs.

Range and habitat
This species is known only from Isla Escudo de Veraguas in Bocas del Toro Province, Panama. If it is restricted to this island (there is a juvenile specimen from the mainland that may belong to this species), it is the only tropical salamander that is endemic to an island. It is found close to sea level in humid lowland forest and mangrove forest. The type series was found in decaying fronds and associated moist litter near a fallen palm in a coconut palm grove.

It is threatened by habitat loss (forest clearance).

References

maritima
Amphibians of Panama
Endemic fauna of Panama
Taxa named by David B. Wake
Amphibians described in 2000
Taxonomy articles created by Polbot